Mattia Capoferri (born 30 May 2001) is an Italian footballer who plays as defender for  club Piacenza.

Career

Early career 
Capoferri played for AlbinoLeffe and then moved to Brescia. He made 18 appearances and scored two goals for the under–19s.

Lecco 
In 2020, he moved on loan to Lecco. He made his debut with Lecco on 27 September 2020, in the home 1–0 victory against Giana Erminio.

On 5 January 2022, he returned to Lecco on another loan until the end of the 2021–22 season.

Piacenza 
On 30 August 2022, Capoferri signed a three-year contract with Piacenza.

References 

2001 births
Sportspeople from the Province of Brescia
Footballers from Lombardy
Living people
U.C. AlbinoLeffe players
Brescia Calcio players
Calcio Lecco 1912 players
Piacenza Calcio 1919 players
Association football defenders
Serie C players
Italian footballers